Theodore S. ("Ted") Berger is a New York City-based arts activist who was one of the creators of the Cultural Council Foundation's Artists Project, which grew to be the largest CETA art program in the US.

Currently the Executive Director of NYCreates, he's also Executive Director Emeritus of the New York Foundation for the Arts, from which he retired in 2005. He first joined NYFA in 1973 as the United States' first statewide Artists-in-Schools Coordinator.

References

Activists from New York City
Living people
Year of birth missing (living people)